NGC 3810 is a spiral galaxy located in the constellation Leo. It is located at a distance of circa 50 million light years from Earth, which, given its apparent dimensions, means that NGC 3810 is about 60,000 light years across. It was discovered by William Herschel on March 15, 1784.

The bright galaxy NGC 3810 demonstrates spiral structure similar to that of Messier 77. The central part of the galaxy disk is of high surface brightness and features tightly wound spirals. Outside this disk lie more open arms with lower surface brightness. The bright central region is thought to be forming many new stars and is outshining the outer areas of the galaxy by some margin. Further out the galaxy displays strikingly rich dust clouds along its spiral arms. Hot young blue stars show up in giant clusters far from the centre and the arms are also littered with bright red giant stars. Three supernovae have been observed in NGC 3810, SN 1997dq (type Ib, mag: 15), SN 2000ew (type Ic, mag: 14.9), and SN 2022zut (Type Ia, mag: 12.8).

NGC 3810 forms a small group of galaxies with NGC 3773, the NGC 3810 Group, which is part of the Virgo Supercluster.

Gallery

References

External links 

Unbarred spiral galaxies
Leo (constellation)
3810
06644
36243
Astronomical objects discovered in 1784
Discoveries by William Herschel